The 1925 Ohio State Buckeyes football team was an American football team that represented Ohio State University in the 1925 Big Ten Conference football season. In its 13th season under head coach John Wilce, the team compiled a 4–3–1 record and outscored opponents by a total of 55 to 45, but lost for the fourth straight season to Michigan.

Schedule

Coaching staff
 John Wilce, head coach, 13th year

References

Ohio State
Ohio State Buckeyes football seasons
Ohio State Buckeyes football